Wadham Locke (1779–1835) was an English banker and politician.

Life
Locke was born at Brownston House, Devizes, Wiltshire, the only son of Wadham Locke II and his wife Anne Sutton, daughter of James Sutton. He was High Sheriff of Wiltshire in 1804. In 1805 he purchased Rowdeford House and estate, two miles northwest of Devizes, from Thomas Wyatt.

Locke was an MP for Devizes in 1832; he first stood for Devizes in 1818 as a reformer, at which time the constituency had not been contested since 1765.

Family

The eldest son Wadham Locke married first, in 1828, Caroline Mary Thompson, daughter of Henry Thompson of Yorkshire, who died in 1842. He married secondly, in 1844, Albinia Dalton, daughter of John Dalton of Steningford Park.
The second son Francis Alexander Sydenham Locke married in 1835 Katherine Harriet Fellowes, eldest daughter of Thomas Fellowes R.N.
The fourth son John Locke married in 1839 Frances Augusta Wayne, daughter of Thomas Moore Wayne. He joined the East India Company as a civil servant in Bengal, and later lived at Chicklade House in Wiltshire.

The Lockes had six daughters. The youngest in the family was Frances Isabella, known as the diarist Fanny Duberly, who married in 1850 Henry Duberly (1822–1891). The eldest daughter, Anna Maria Selina, married George Purefoy-Jervoise. After his death, she married in 1848 Francis Marx. The other daughters were:

Elizabeth Sarah, died 1833
Anne, married 1838 the Rev. Henry Paddon
Louisa, married William Lawrence Colquhoun, and secondly James Dunlop of Glasgow
Katharine Powell, married George Duberly, colonel of the 77th Regiment.

References

1779 births
1835 deaths
English bankers
UK MPs 1832–1835
Members of the Parliament of the United Kingdom for English constituencies
People from Wiltshire